Buriki One: World Grapple Tournament '99 in Tokyo, otherwise known simply as Buriki One, is a 3D competitive fighting game produced by SNK and released as a coin-operated arcade game in 1999. It is the seventh and final game developed for SNK's short-lived Hyper Neo Geo 64 hardware and like most games released for the platform, it has never been officially ported to home consoles. It was planned for release for the PS1 platform but was never officially released.

Gameplay
The control system uses two buttons for movement, keeping the player on a 2-D axis, despite the 3D arena. Pressing the left button moves the character in the left direction, pressing the right moves in that respective direction. Double tapping each button produces a dash in each corresponding direction for evasion and closing distance. Pressing both buttons makes the character block.

By using the joystick, the player can execute attacks of varying damage levels. By pressing in the forward direction, the player executes a medium attack, up forward a stronger attack, and down, forward is the weakest, but fastest attack. By combining various combinations of the movement of the stick, a special attack is performed for increased damage. Unlike the 2-D iterations, however, no ranged attacks are present, keeping the preferred fighting distance between players at close quarters.

A fighter can win by knocking out his opponent, forcing his opponent to surrender, or by winning a judgment by a panel of three judges if time runs out. The judges are allowed to cast ballots for either fighter or a tie ballot that does not contribute to the decision. A tie will force a player to either give up or buy a continue. Should a fighter fall outside of the ring, the fight is paused until both fighters are sent back into the ring to resume the fight.

Plot

Setting
It's Spring 1999... Fighters from across the world gather at the Tokyo Dome to compete in the World Grapple Tournament. Each contender has their own fighting discipline, ranging from the popular styles of Boxing, Karate and Professional wrestling, to the lesser known arts of Aikido, T'ai chi and Muay Thai. Finally, they have the chance to prove which martial art conquers all!

Characters
Gai Tendo - The lead character, a 17-year-old fighter who uses a self-styled martial art (dubbed Total Fighting in the game). He has been training by himself at Okinawa ever since graduating middle school. CV:Nobuyuki Hiyama
Rob Python - A 35-year-old super heavyweight boxer currently residing in LA. CV:Kōji Ishii
Jacques Ducalis - A 32-year-old open-weight Gold medalist and current Director of the French Judo Society. CV:Eiji Tsuda
Seo Yong Song - An 18-year-old taekwondo master who was the Middleweight champion in the World Taekwondo Championship during the previous year. Currently attending college with a major in quantum physics. CV:Jun Hashimoto
Takato Saionji - A 17-year-old private high school student from Kyoto who has thoroughly mastered Aikido from his grandfather Takayuki. CV:Eiji Yano
Payak Sitpitak (พยัคฆ์ สิทธิพิทักษ์) - A 40-year-old Muay Thai ranker who is the currently the Top Welterweight athlete in the Muay Thai circuit. CV:Atsushi Yamanishi
Song Xuandao - A 70-year-old taiji master who is well known within the Chinese fighting world. CV:Keiichiro Sakagi
Patrick Van Heyting - A 37-year-old popular pro wrestler from the Netherlands.  CV:Franky Nakamura
Ivan Sokolov - A 27-year-old freestyle wrestler and an 87 kg class Gold Medalist. Despite his rough-like posture, he has won against his opponents due to his technical skills. CV:Hiroyuki Arita
Akatsuki-Maru - A 28-year-old sumo wrestler who currently holds the title of Sekiwake. CV:Eiji Yano
Ryo Sakazaki - The 32-year-old instructor of the Kyokugen School of karate. Originally the main character from the Art of Fighting series. CV:Masaki Usui
Silber - The final boss in the game. A one-eyed martial artist from Germany who uses his own style of karate. His name means silver in German. Although Silber has never officially competed in a fighting tournament, he has been sight at numerous parts of the world over the past 30 years, fighting against numerous well known martial artists. Silber is a computer-only character initially and only becomes a controllable character after the computer-controlled Silber is defeated by the player with each of the other characters. CV:Hiroyuki Arita

Buriki Girl
In Japan, people were asked to vote for their top 5 "Fight Round girls". The winner of the vote would appear after a 2-Player battle.
 Hinako Tono (the winner)
 Nanami Sakai
 Shizue Sakurada
 Midori Marukame
 Hikaru Koda

Reception 
In Japan, Game Machine listed Buriki One on their June 15, 1999 issue as being the most-successful arcade game of the month.

Related games 
 Art of Fighting - The series from which Ryo Sakazaki originated.
 The King of Fighters - Gai Tendo has appeared in the console versions of The King of Fighters '99, as well as in The King of Fighters 2000 as an alternate "Striker" (a character who assists the player in combat). Gai and Silber later appeared as secret opponents in The King of Fighters XI.
 Fatal Fury: Wild Ambition - The PlayStation version features the older Ryo Sakazaki from Buriki One under the name of Mr. Karate.
 Neo Geo Battle Coliseum - Ryo Sakazaki appears as his Buriki One incarnation under the name of Mr. Karate.

References

External links 
 Buriki One at the old SNK homepage in Internet Archive
 Buriki One at NBC Museum of SNK Playmore

1999 video games
3D fighting games
Arcade video games
Arcade-only video games
Fighting games
Hyper Neogeo 64 games
Japan-exclusive video games
Mixed martial arts video games
Multiplayer video games
SNK games
Muay Thai video games
Video games set in 1999
Video games developed in Japan